Lara Williamson is an Irish-born children's author.

Biography
Williamson was born and studied in Northern Ireland before moving to London. She worked for magazines including ELLE and New Woman, and was beauty editor at J-17.

Writing
Her first two novels, A Boy Called Hope (2014) and The Boy Who Sailed the Ocean in an Armchair (2015) were published by Usborne and were shortlisted for the Waterstones Children's Book Prize and the Blue Peter Book Award respectively. They were followed by Just call me Spaghetti-Hoop Boy (2017) and The Girl with space in her heart (2019), while Midge and Mo (with illustrations by Becky Cameron) was published by Stripes in 2020 and was aimed at a younger readership.

Published works

For younger readers

References

External links
 

Living people
Irish children's writers
21st-century writers from Northern Ireland
Year of birth missing (living people)